Cartoonists - Foot Soldiers of Democracy is a 2014 documentary film directed by Stéphanie Valloatto about 12 cartoonists around the world who risk their lives to defend democracy. The film premiered in the Special Screenings section at the 2014 Cannes Film Festival. The film was nominated for the César Award for Best Documentary Film at the 40th César Awards.

Featuring
 Plantu, French cartoonist  
 Jeff Danziger, American cartoonist  
 Rayma Suprani, Venezuelan cartoonist 
 Angel Boligan, Cuban-Mexican cartoonist 
 Mikhail Zlatkovsky, Russian cartoonist 
 Michel Kichka, Belgian-Israeli cartoonist 
 Baha Boukhari, Palestinian cartoonist 
 Zoho (Lassane Zohore), Ivorian cartoonist 
 Damien Glez, Franco-Burkinabé cartoonist 
 Willis from Tunis (Nadia Khiari), Tunisian cartoonist
 Slim (Menouar Merabtene), Algerian cartoonist
 Pi San (Wang Bo), Chinese cartoonist

Release
Cartoonists - Foot Soldiers of Democracy premiered at the 2014 Cannes Film Festival on 19 May. A public preview screening of the film was held at the Place de la République in Paris on 23 May 2014, before its theatrical release on 28 May.

On 7 January and 9 January 2015, the film was broadcast on Canal+ and France 3 respectively, in tribute to victims of the Charlie Hebdo attack.

The film was released on DVD, Blu-ray and VOD on 2 December 2014.

References

External links
 

2014 films
2014 documentary films
French documentary films
2010s French-language films
Documentary films about visual artists
Documentary films about human rights
2010s French films